Fabrice Nsakala Mayélé (born 21 July 1990) is a professional footballer who last played for Beşiktaş. He plays as a box-to-box midfielder, but is also capable of playing as a left-back or centre-back. He is a former French youth international, having represented his nation at under-17, under-18 under-19, and under-21 levels.

Career

Troyes
Born in Le Blanc-Mesnil, Seine-Saint-Denis, Nsakala began his football career at AS Bondy. He spent four years in the club's youth system before departing the Parisian suburbs and joining Troyes AC in Aube. After excelling in the club's academy and earning youth international caps, Nsakala was called up to the senior team by manager Ludovic Batelli. He made his professional debut on 9 September 2008 in the team's Coupe de la Ligue match against Angers. Nsakala appeared as a substitute in the match with Troyes recording a 2–1 victory. Three days later, he made his league debut in the team's 2–1 defeat to Clermont again appearing as a substitute. On 19 September 2008, Nsakala made his first professional start playing 62 minutes in a 1–0 loss to Lens. He remained a fixture in the first-team for the remainder of the season often in a substitute's role. On 7 March 2009, Nsakala signed his first professional contract agreeing to a three-year deal until June 2012.

For the 2009–10 season, Troyes were relegated to the Championnat National and, despite playing against mostly semi-professional competition, Nsakala only featured in six league matches. The club immediately returned to the second division and Nsakala featured in the team's opening league match of the season against Vannes. He played the entire match in a 1–0 defeat.

Anderlecht
On 29 August 2013, Nsakala joined Belgian Pro League side Anderlecht for an undisclosed fee and signed a three-year contract.

Alanyaspor
In July 2017 Nsakala joined Süper Lig on a permanent transfer after spending the previous season on loan at the club.

Beşiktaş
In August 2020, Nsakala joined Beşiktaş in Süper Lig.

Career statistics

Honours
Anderlecht
 Belgian Pro League: 2013–14
 Belgian Super Cup: 2014

Beşiktaş
Süper Lig: 2020–21
Türkiye Kupası: 2020–21

References

External links

 
 
 
 

1990 births
Living people
People from Le Blanc-Mesnil
Footballers from Seine-Saint-Denis
Association football defenders
Democratic Republic of the Congo footballers
Democratic Republic of the Congo international footballers
France youth international footballers
France under-21 international footballers
2017 Africa Cup of Nations players
French sportspeople of Democratic Republic of the Congo descent
French footballers
ES Troyes AC players
R.S.C. Anderlecht players
Alanyaspor footballers
Beşiktaş J.K. footballers
Ligue 1 players
Ligue 2 players
Championnat National players
Belgian Pro League players
Süper Lig players
French expatriate footballers
Democratic Republic of the Congo expatriate footballers
Expatriate footballers in Belgium
Expatriate footballers in Turkey
21st-century Democratic Republic of the Congo people
French expatriate sportspeople in Belgium
French expatriate sportspeople in Turkey
Democratic Republic of the Congo expatriate sportspeople in Belgium
Democratic Republic of the Congo expatriate sportspeople in Turkey